Rhynchium brunneum is a species of potter wasp found in Asia. Across the wide range, they show considerable variation in the patterning and several subspecies have been described, including:
 R. b. brunneum (Fabricius, 1793)
 R. b. ceylonicum Giordani Soika, 1994
 R. b. maladivum Gusenleitner, 2003

References 

Potter wasps